Aliso: A Journal of Systematic and Evolutionary Botany is a peer-reviewed scientific journal that publishes original research on plant taxonomy and evolutionary botany with a worldwide scope, but with a particular focus on the floristics of the Western United States. Aliso, first published in 1948, is the scientific journal of the Rancho Santa Ana Botanic Garden. The journal is named for the western sycamore, Platanus racemosa, which was commonly called by its Spanish name aliso.

It is noted as the journal where Robert F. Thorne first published the Thorne system of flowering plant classification in 1968.

References

External links
 
 Aliso at SCImago Journal Rank
 Aliso at Botanical Scientific Journals

Botany journals
Publications established in 1948
English-language journals
1948 establishments in California